Anacamptis coriophora, the bug orchid, is a species of orchid, found in Europe, the Mediterranean, and the Near East to Iran.

Taxonomy
Originally this was identified as Orchis coriophora ssp fragans (Pollini) K.Richt. and even today some authorities like Delforge use the original name to present it as the new species Orchis fragrans Pollini. However the large databases at Kew, World Ckecklist etc. agree that the correct and accepted name for this taxon is Anacamptis coriophora (L.) R.M.Bateman, Pridgeon & M.W.Chase without any distinction being made between sub species.

References

External links
http://www.ukwildflowers.com/Web_pages/anacamptis_coriophora_bug_orchid.htm

coriophora
Plants described in 1753
Taxa named by Carl Linnaeus